The Canadian Vickers Vista was a Canadian-designed single-seat flying boat.

Design and development
The Vista was the first Canadian-designed monoplane. It had a duralumin sheet hull and the tail was made of framed metal tubing. The wings were made of wood and the wing and tail surfaces were fabric. The design proved to have some undesirable traits. Since the RCAF chose the de Havilland DH.60 Moth, only one Vista was ever built.

Operational history
Once the prototype was completed, the production order was cancelled. After testing the airframe, the aircraft was shipped to the (RCAF) Air Station at (Jericho Beach), Vancouver in September 1930, where it was used for taxiing practice. When not being used it was moored out to test the effects of salt water on its duralumin hull. By 1931 the corrosion on the hull was bad enough that it was recommended for scrapping and this was done in May of that year.

Specifications

References

External links
www. airforce.forces.gc.ca

Flying boats
Vista
Single-engined pusher aircraft
High-wing aircraft